, born in the Hiroshima Prefecture, is a Japanese former volleyball player who competed in the 1964 Summer Olympics as a member of Japan's bronze medal team. He played in all nine matches, scoring 57 individual points.

References

1942 births
Living people
Japanese men's volleyball players
Olympic volleyball players of Japan
Volleyball players at the 1964 Summer Olympics
Olympic bronze medalists for Japan
Olympic medalists in volleyball
Asian Games medalists in volleyball
Volleyball players at the 1962 Asian Games
Volleyball players at the 1966 Asian Games
Medalists at the 1964 Summer Olympics
Medalists at the 1962 Asian Games
Medalists at the 1966 Asian Games
Asian Games gold medalists for Japan
20th-century Japanese people